Dreher (Kőbánya) Brewery (Dreher Sörgyárak) in Budapest is owned by Asahi Breweries. Its main products are the Dreher Gold, Arany Ászok and Kőbányai Világos pilsener-style lagers but it also brews Dreher Bak (a double bock), a full-bodied dark beer with a slight taste of caramel.

Until its closure Kanizsa Brewery also belonged to the group, and produced beer under the Dreher Classic, Kanizsai Világos, Kanizsai Kinizsi, Balatoni Világos and Paracelsus brands.

Dreher Brewery was owned by the South African Breweries since 1993, and subsequently by SABMiller since 2002. As part of the agreements made with regulators before Anheuser-Busch InBev was allowed to acquire SABMiller in October 2016, Dreher was sold to Asahi Breweries of Japan on December 13, 2016; the deal is expected to close during the first half of 2017.

History of the company

 

Anton Dreher was an Austrian brewer magnate.

Today, Dreher Breweries Ltd. is one of the three leading players in the Hungarian beer market. The brewery still operates in Kőbánya, where the beers are brewing with the latest technology methods in the buildings, which were restored to their original splendour.

1854 – Peter Schmidt founder of “Kőbányai Serfőző Társaság” produced the first “Kőbányai Ser”
1862 – Anton Dreher, the “King of Beer” bought the “Kőbányai Serház”.
1870 – Anton Dreher Jr. takes over the leadership of the company. He developed the technology and capacity of his factories, and Kőbánya soon became the largest brewery of Hungary.
1905 – Among his three sons, Anton Dreher Jr. entrusted Jenő with the management of the Kőbánya brewery, which became a corporation in 1907 under the name "Dreher Antal Kőbányai Serfőzdéje”. The company was the local market leader till World War I.
1923 – Jenő Dreher continued to buy shares from the capitals of his competitors, from Haggenmacher Kőbányai and Budafoki Rt., Barber and Klusemann Brewery and the "Első Magyar Részvény Serfőzde”. The „Dreher Kombinát”, which was merged from these companies in 1923, bought up the "Királyi Serfőzde” of Kanizsa in 1928 also.
1933 – "Dreher-Haggenmacher Első Magyar Részvény Serfőzde” was launched, which ruled 70% of the market with its excellent beers.
1948 – The property of the family kept in Hungary was taken into state ownership.
1949 – Establishment of "Kőbányai Sörgyárak Nemzeti Vállalat”.
1981 – Birth of the independent “Kőbányai Sörgyár”.
1992 – “Kőbányai Sörgyár” was converted into a shareholding company.
1993 – The brewery became a member of the South African Breweries (SAB).
1997 – The company takes up the name “Dreher Sörgyárak Ltd”.
2002 – The South African Breweries merged with the Miller Brewing Company to create the SABMiller group, which is the second largest brewing company of the world, with brewing interests or distribution agreements in over 60 countries across six continents. SABMiller plc is listed in the London stock exchange and the Johannesburg stock exchange, and its international brand portfolio includes excellent brands with a great past, such as Pilsner Urquell, Peroni Nastro Azzurro, Miller Genuine Draft, and Castle Lager.
2017 – Sold to Asahi Breweries of Japan.

Hungarian brands

 Dreher Gold
 Dreher Bak
 Dreher Red Ale
 Dreher Pale Ale
 Dreher Hidegkomlós (dry hopped)
 Dreher Alkoholmentes
 Arany Ászok
 Arany Ászok Alkoholmentes
 Kőbányai Sör

Import brands

 Pilsner Urquell
 Hofbrau Weissbier
 Floris
 Peroni
 Asahi Superdry
 Kozel Czerny
 Captain Jack
 Kingswood cider

Licensed brands

 Kozel
 Hofbräu

See also
 Beer in Hungary

References

Beer in Hungary
Hungarian brands
Manufacturing companies based in Budapest
Asahi Breweries
Hungary
1854 establishments in Hungary